The Clay Pigeon is a 1949 American film noir directed by Richard Fleischer and written by Carl Foreman, based on a true story.  The drama features Bill Williams and Barbara Hale, a real-life husband and wife.

Plot
Jim Fletcher (Williams), a former inmate in a Japanese prisoner-of-war camp, awakes from a coma at a naval hospital, and is then informed that he has been accused of murder. As Fletcher is uncertain of his guilt, he escapes from the hospital to search for his best friend, another ex-POW.

Cast
 Bill Williams as Jim Fletcher
 Barbara Hale as Martha Gregory
 Richard Quine as Ted Niles
 Richard Loo as Ken Tokoyama aka The Weasel
 Frank Fenton as Lt. Cmdr. Prentice
 Frank Wilcox as Navy Hospital Doctor
 Marya Marco as Helen Minoto
 Robert Bray as Gunsel Blake
 Martha Hyer as Miss Harwick, Wheeler's Receptionist
 Harold Landon as Blind Veteran
 James Craven as John Wheeler

Depiction of Japanese Americans
Although the movie shows Jim's Japanese captors as extremely sadistic and inhumane, it also casts the much-maligned Japanese Americans in a positive light. As Mrs. Mioto, (a Japanese American) helps Jim escape his pursuers, he sees a photograph of her deceased husband, Sergeant John Mioto, member of the 442nd Infantry Division of the U.S. Army. It is accompanied by the certificate for his Distinguished Service Cross, awarded for "Extraordinary Heroism".

Film noir specialist Eddie Muller speculates this is the first time the highly decorated 442nd Division, composed mostly of Japanese Americans, was acknowledged in a movie, and states that this was not simply the studio's formulaic trope of balancing something negative with a positive, but rather screenwriter Carl Foreman's personal progressive outlook.

Reception

Critical response
Time Out film reviews wrote of the film, "Directed by Fleischer with tight, spare energy, although the implausible script and bland leading performances (with Hale as the dead friend's wife, initially hostile but soon losing her heart) make it much inferior to The Narrow Margin.''

References

External links
 
 
 
 
 

1949 films
1940s psychological thriller films
American black-and-white films
1940s English-language films
Film noir
Films directed by Richard Fleischer
RKO Pictures films
American psychological thriller films
Films scored by Paul Sawtell
1940s American films